Eagles Temple may refer to:

in the United States
 Eagles Temple (Akron, Ohio), NRHP-listed
 Eagles Temple (Canton, Ohio), NRHP-listed

See also
List of Eagles buildings